William George Fargo (May 20, 1818August 3, 1881) was a pioneer American expressman who helped found the modern-day financial firms of American Express Company and Wells Fargo with his business partner, Henry Wells. He was also the 27th Mayor of Buffalo, serving from 1862 until 1866 during the U.S. Civil War.

Early life
William George Fargo was born in Pompey in Onondaga County, New York on May 20, 1818. He was the eldest of twelve children of William C. Fargo (1791–1878) (formerly of New London, Connecticut) and Stacy Chappel Strong (1799–1869). His younger brother was James Congdell Strong Fargo (1829–1915), president of the American Express Company for 30 years.  William's education consisted only of the rudiments taught in a country school as he left school at the age of 13 to carry the mail in Pompey and help support his family.

His father, who was born in New London, Connecticut, fought in the War of 1812. The elder Fargo was stationed at Fort Niagara and fought in the battle of Queenston Heights under General Van Rensselaer that resulted in the death of British General Isaac Brock. Fargo was wounded in right thigh, just before the Americans took possession of the ground. 

His grandfather was William Beebe Fargo (1757–1801), who served with distinction in the American Revolutionary War, the son of William Fargo (1726–1813). His great-grandfather was the son of Moses Fargo (1691–1798) and the grandson of Moses Fargo (1648–1742), who was born in Lyons, France. His father Jacent Fargeau, had emigrated with his wife and children to Wales, from where Moses and his elder brother Aaron went to Norfolk, Connecticut in 1670.

Career
At the age of 13, Fargo left school and started carrying mail for his native village of Pompey, New York. In the winter of 1838, Fargo started working with Hough & Gilchrist, grocers, from Syracuse. He remained there for a year until he went to work with the grocers Roswell and Willett Hinman. After three years, Fargo obtained a clerkship in the forwarding house of Dunford & Co., Syracuse. In 1841, he became a freight agent, an express messenger between Albany and Buffalo, for the Auburn and Syracuse Railroad in Auburn. A year later in 1843, Fargo was a Resident Agent in Buffalo, New York. He left the Auburn and Syracuse Railroad and joined Livingston, Wells & Co., as messenger.

American Express Company

On April 1, 1845, along with Henry Wells and Daniel Dunning, Fargo organized the Western Express which ran from Buffalo to Cincinnati, St. Louis, Chicago and intermediate points, under the name of Wells & Co. At that time, there were no railroad facilities west of Buffalo, and Fargo, who had charge of the business, made use of steamboats and wagons.

In 1845, Daniel Dunning withdrew from the company and in 1846, Henry Wells sold out his interest in this concern to William A. Livingston, who became Fargo's partner in Livingston, Fargo & Company.  In 1850, three competing express companies: Wells & Company (Henry Wells), Livingston, Fargo & Company (Fargo and William A. Livingston), and Wells, Butterfield & Company, the successor earlier in 1850 of Butterfield, Wasson & Company (John Warren Butterfield), were consolidated and became the American Express Company, with Wells as President and Fargo as Secretary.

In 1866, upon the resignation of Henry Wells and American Express' merger with the Merchants Union Express Company, Fargo was elected President of the American Express Company. He was the company's president until his death in 1881, at which point his brother, J. C. Fargo, assumed the presidency, holding the post until 1914.

Wells Fargo & Company
In 1852, Henry Wells and Fargo created Wells Fargo & Co. when Butterfield (and other directors of American Express) objected to the extension of its operations to California. The original Wells Fargo & Co. was created to facilitate an express business between New York and San Francisco by way of the Isthmus of Panama and on the Pacific coast.  The new company offered banking services, which included buying gold and selling paper bank drafts, and express services, which included rapid delivery of gold and anything else valuable.  The company opened for business in the gold rush city of San Francisco, and soon the Company's agents opened offices in the other new cities and mining camps in the West.

In 1861, Wells Fargo & Company bought and reorganized the Overland Mail Co., which had been formed in 1857 to carry the United States mail, and of which Fargo had been one of the original promoters.

Other
Fargo was a director and vice-president of New York Central Railroad Company, a director and shareholder of the Northern Pacific Railway, a director of the Buffalo, New York and Philadelphia Railroad Company, and a shareholder in the Buffalo Coal Company and the McKean and Buffalo Railroad Company. He was also a stockholder in several large manufacturing establishments in Buffalo.

Political career
In 1861, he was elected mayor of Buffalo, serving from 1862 to 1866, as he was elected to a second term in 1863.  During his term as mayor, the Buffalo riot of 1862 took place. Fargo was a lifelong Democrat and stood against secession. He supported the Union during the Civil War by paying a part of the salary of his employees that were drafted.

Personal life
In January 1840, Fargo married Anna H. Williams (1820–1890), daughter of Nathan Williams, one of the proprietors of Pompey, with whom he had eight children:
Georgia Fargo (1841–1892), who died unmarried
Alma Cornelia Fargo (1842–1842), who died young
Sarah Irene Fargo (1843–1854)
William George Fargo, Jr. (1845–1872), who married Minerva Elizabeth Prendergast (1848–1873)
Hannah Sophia Fargo (1847–1851), who died young
Mary Louise Fargo (1851–1852), who died young
Helen Lacy Fargo (1857–1886), who married Herbert G. Squiers (1859–1911), a diplomat who served as Minister to Cuba (1902–1905) and Panama (1906–1909)
Edwin Morgan Fargo (1861–1865), who died young

In 1868, when he was 50, Fargo bought  on the Buffalo's west side and between 1868–1872, he built the Fargo Mansion at Jersey and Fargo Streets, which was Buffalo's largest mansion. The home was completed in 1872 at a cost of $600,000. Another $100,000 was spent to furnish and decorate the  mansion. Michael Rizzo, a Buffalo historian, wrote:

He died on August 3, 1881 after battling an illness for several months. After his funeral on August 7, 1881, he was buried at Forest Lawn Cemetery. At the time of his death, only two of his children were living, Georgia and Helen Fargo. William's brother, J.C. Fargo, succeeded him as President of American Express after his death.

Legacy
Fargo's wife Anna died in 1890 and their two surviving children lived elsewhere so the Fargo Mansion stood vacant for 10 years.  It was deemed too expensive to maintain and with no buyer, the mansion was demolished and the block cut into residential lots in 1901. The mansion and estate grounds were only 30 years old.

Fargo Avenue in Buffalo; the Fargo Quadrangle at the University at Buffalo; and Fargo, North Dakota are named after him.

The Fargo Estate Historic District was listed on the National Register of Historic Places in 2016.

See also

 American Express
 Wells Fargo
 J.C. Fargo
 Henry Wells
John Warren Butterfield

References

Notes

Sources

External links
 
 

1818 births
1881 deaths
Fargo–Moorhead
Businesspeople from Buffalo, New York
Mayors of Buffalo, New York
American people of Welsh descent
Clerks
Wells Fargo employees
American Express people
Burials at Forest Lawn Cemetery (Buffalo)
Businesspeople from Syracuse, New York
19th-century American politicians
Politicians from Buffalo, New York
New York (state) Democrats
People from Pompey, New York
Mayors of places in New York (state)
19th-century American businesspeople